Pennsylvania State Senate District 19 includes part of Chester County. It is currently represented by Democrat Carolyn Comitta.

District profile
The district includes the following areas:

 Coatesville
 Downingtown
 East Bradford Township
 East Caln Township
 East Fallowfield Township
 East Goshen Township
 East Nottingham Township
 Easttown Township
 Elk Township
 Highland Township
 Londonderry Township
 Lower Oxford Township
 Malvern
 Modena
 New London Township
 Newlin Township
 Oxford
 Penn Township
 South Coatesville
 Tredyffrin Township
 Upper Oxford Township
 Valley Township
 West Bradford Township
 West Chester
 West Fallowfield Township
 West Goshen Township
 West Marlborough Township
 West Nottingham Township
 West Whiteland Township
 Willistown Township

Senators

References

Pennsylvania Senate districts
Government of Chester County, Pennsylvania